Fernando Hernández Ramírez (May 28, 1944 – May 4, 1997), known in his native Costa Rica as El Príncipe (The Prince), was a  footballer.

Club career
He played his entire career for Deportivo Saprissa, and is considered an idol for their fans. He won a total of eleven titles with them, including six consecutive championships from 1972 to 1977, a record both in Costa Rica as well as in the American continent.

International career
He played 10 games for the Costa Rica national football team during the 60's and 70's, scoring one goal. He represented his country in 2 FIFA World Cup qualification matches.

International goals
Scores and results list Costa Rica's goal tally first.

Personal life and death
His parents were Víctor Hernández and Teresa Ramírez. His brother, Francisco Hernández, played with Saprissa's midfield too.

Fernando died on May 4, 1997, as a victim of cancer at age 52 years.

References

See also

1944 births
1997 deaths
Association football midfielders
Costa Rican footballers
Costa Rica international footballers
Deportivo Saprissa players
Deaths from cancer in Costa Rica